Ridgely McClure "Ridge" Bond (July 12, 1922 – May 6, 1997) was an American actor, singer and businessman, who is best known for playing the role of Curly in the musical Oklahoma! on Broadway and on tour. He retired from acting when the musical closed in 1954, and entered the insurance business.

Life and career
Bond was born in McAlester, Oklahoma. He attended the University of Tulsa, where he played a leading role in the play Green Grow the Lilacs, which was later adapted as Oklahoma!. He served in the U.S. Navy in World War II.  After his discharge, he joined the Broadway cast of Oklahoma! in 1946, soon taking over as Curly for Howard Keel, and, according to Deseret News, he played the role of Curly for the longest period of any actor during the original Broadway production. He then toured with the show and played the role in the 1951 and 1953 Broadway revivals. He reportedly performed this role 2,600 times during his career.  He was also the only Oklahoma native to play the role.

In 1953, Bond was instrumental in assisting Oklahoma state representative (and later Governor) George Nigh to promote the show's title song in becoming the Oklahoma state song. After Oklahoma! closed in 1954, Bond retired from acting and joined American Family Life Insurance Co. as a district coordinator in its Tulsa office. He continued in the insurance business.

Honors
In 1991, Bond was the recipient of the Lynn Riggs Award, presented by Rogers State University. In 1993, the Oklahoma Heritage Association named Bond an Ambassador of Goodwill.

Bond's likeness, in character as Curly (along with Laurie), was featured on the U.S. postage stamp commemorating the 50th anniversary of Oklahoma!  Also in 1993, Bond was inducted into the Oklahoma Hall of Fame.

Family life
Bond married restoration artist Maxine Vincent (1921–2008) on September 25, 1943. They were married for 54 years, and had two children, musician and sound engineer Geoffrey Bond and Pamela Bond-Simmons.

He died in Tulsa, Oklahoma, in 1997, aged 74. He and his wife are buried at Woodlawn Cemetery in Claremore, Oklahoma.

Notes

References

External links

The Ridge Bond Archive Home Page
Photo of Bond as Curley, with Patricia Northrop as Laurey
1947 Photo of Patricia Northrop and Ridge Bond from 1947 "national company" 
Photo of Bond's grave

1922 births
1997 deaths
People from McAlester, Oklahoma
American male musical theatre actors
American male stage actors
American male voice actors
Male actors from Tulsa, Oklahoma
20th-century American male actors
20th-century American singers
Businesspeople from Tulsa, Oklahoma
20th-century American male singers
United States Navy personnel of World War II
20th-century American businesspeople
University of Tulsa alumni